Euphaedra castanea is a butterfly in the family Nymphalidae. It is found in the Democratic Republic of the Congo (Lualaba and Shaba).

References

Butterflies described in 1981
castanea
Endemic fauna of the Democratic Republic of the Congo
Butterflies of Africa